Sir William Morice (6 November 1602 – 12 December 1676) of Werrington in Devon, was an English statesman and theologian. He served as Secretary of State for the Northern Department and a Lord of the Treasury from June 1660 to September 1668.

Life
Morice was educated at Exeter College, Oxford. He was elected Member of Parliament for Devon to fill a vacancy in 1648, but was excluded in Pride's Purge in December of that year, probably before he had taken his seat. Nevertheless, he was appointed High Sheriff of Devon in 1651, and returned to Parliament as MP for Devon in the First Protectorate Parliament elected in 1654. He subsequently represented Devon again in the Second Protectorate Parliament, Newport (Cornwall) in the Third Protectorate Parliament.

A relation of General Monck, Morice assisted in the Restoration and was knighted in 1660. He was also made a Privy Counsellor and appointed Secretary of State for the Northern Department, an office he held until he resigned in 1668; he was apparently an undistinguished minister, but justified his tenure of office by his usefulness in the House of Commons. In the Convention Parliament of 1660 he was re-elected for Newport but was also elected for Plymouth, which he chose to represent, and was that city's MP until his death 16 years later.

In 1657, during the Commonwealth, he published a treatise on the administration of the sacrament to all church members.

Marriage and children
Morice married Elizabeth Prideaux, a daughter of Humphrey Prideaux (abt 1573–1617) of Soldon, and Honor Fortescue, by whom he had children including 
Sir William Morice, 1st Baronet (c.1628–1690), eldest son and heir, MP, created a baronet in 1661.
John Morice (c. 1630–1705), MP.
Nicholas Morice (c.1640–1712), MP.
Anne (b. c.1653), who married Sir John Pole, 3rd Baronet
Thomasine, who married Sir Walter Moyle

Notes

References
 
 Sir George Clark, The Later Stuarts 1660-1714 (2nd edition - Oxford: Oxford University Press, 1955)

1602 births
1676 deaths
Secretaries of State for the Northern Department
High Sheriffs of Devon
Alumni of Exeter College, Oxford
English MPs 1640–1648
English MPs 1654–1655
English MPs 1656–1658
English MPs 1659
English MPs 1660
English MPs 1661–1679
Members of the Parliament of England (pre-1707) for Devon
Members of the Parliament of England for Plymouth